Patrick Foliot (born 1 March 1954) is a French former ice hockey goaltender. He competed in the men's tournament at the 1988 Winter Olympics.

References

1954 births
Living people
People from Saint Pierre and Miquelon
Anglet Hormadi Élite players
French ice hockey goaltenders
Gothiques d'Amiens players
Olympic ice hockey players of France
Ice hockey players at the 1988 Winter Olympics